Nishana may refer to:

Films
 Nishana (1980 film), a 1980 Bollywood action film
 Nishana (1995 film), a 1995 Hindi-language Indian feature film 
 Nishana (2002 film), a 2002 Bengali-language Indian feature film; see List of Bengali films of 2002

Places
 Nishana, Songadh, a village in Gujarat, India